Rafael "Rafa" Páez Cardona (born 10 August 1994) is a Spanish footballer who plays as a centre-back for Mar Menor FC.

Club career

Early career
Born in Orihuela, Alicante, Valencian Community, Páez joined Hércules CF's youth setup in 2006, aged 12, after starting it out at Escuela Municipal de Fútbol de Orihuela. In October 2009 he moved to Real Madrid, along with three other Hércules teammates.

Liverpool
In August 2013, Páez was invited into a trial by Liverpool, and impressed during his time at the club. In September he rescinded his link with the Madrid outfit and signed a two-year contract with the Reds, being assigned to the reserves.

Páez appeared in 15 matches for the under-21s during the campaign, scoring two goals (in a 2–4 loss against West Bromwich Albion and in a 5–2 win against Newcastle United), forming a partnership with Lloyd Jones.

Bologna (loan)
On 7 August 2014, Páez was loaned to Italian Serie B side Bologna in a season-long deal, with an option to buy. He was handed the number 6 jersey for the season.

Páez made his professional debut on 29 August 2014, starting in a 1–2 away loss against Perugia. He appeared in eight league matches for the club (562 minutes of action), but left in January 2015.

Eibar (loan)
On 30 January 2015, Páez joined La Liga's SD Eibar on loan until June, mainly as a replacement to Derby County-bound Raúl Albentosa. However, he was unable to play for the club, as FIFA blocked the transfer alleging an administrative error by Eibar.

Alcorcón
On 6 August 2015, Páez signed a permanent deal with Segunda División side AD Alcorcón. He made his debut for the club on 13 September, coming on as a second-half substitute for Víctor Pastrana in a 1–0 home win against SD Ponferradina.

Páez scored his first professional goal on 24 April 2016, netting the first in a 1–3 away loss against Real Zaragoza. On 4 August of the following year, he terminated his contract with the Alfareros.

Career statistics

Club

References

External links

1994 births
Living people
People from Orihuela
Sportspeople from the Province of Alicante
Spanish footballers
Footballers from the Valencian Community
Association football defenders
Liverpool F.C. players
Serie B players
Ligue 2 players
Bologna F.C. 1909 players
Segunda División players
Segunda División B players
SD Eibar footballers
AD Alcorcón footballers
UCAM Murcia CF players
NK Rudeš players
FC Sochaux-Montbéliard players
NK Istra 1961 players
Croatian Football League players
Spanish expatriate footballers
Spanish expatriate sportspeople in England
Expatriate footballers in England
Spanish expatriate sportspeople in Italy
Expatriate footballers in Italy
Spanish expatriate sportspeople in Croatia
Expatriate footballers in Croatia